National Academy of Construction or NAC Hyderabad is an education institution for development of all types of construction resources, technologies and methodologies for fast-track completion of projects.

History

National Academy of Construction (NAC) was established in 1998, by the state government. The Chief Minister of Telangana is the chairman.

NAC is registered as a ‘Public Society’ and incorporated as a ‘Public Charitable’ institution in September 1998. NAC is in a sprawling 46.46 acres of land at Madhapur, Hitech City, Hyderabad, Telangana

Objective

 Employment generation through basic skill training for construction trades.
 Wage enhancement and an improved quality of life. 
 Capacity building through training government and corporate officials and contractors in good construction and contract management practices.
 Effective and efficient construction project management by training of construction managers. Construction safety management through structured safety management courses.
 Quality supervision, stores management and quality surveying through special structured courses.
 Enhanced quality and methods of instruction through training of trainers.

Mission statement

 Improve safety, efficiency and productivity of the Indian construction industry.
 Upgrade knowledge and skills of construction engineers, contractors, managers, supervisors and workers.

Recognition

National Academy of Construction is an ISO 9001:2008 certified institute. It is also a Vocational Training Provider as recognized by Government of India and represented on the National Council for Vocational Training.

Regional centres 
For administrative convenience, NAC has created six regional centres in Guntur, Kadapa, Visakhapatnam, Karimnagar, Rajahmundry and Hyderabad which are headed by regional directors and assistant directors who are appointed in each district for better co-ordination and quality control of the training programmes.

Facilities
NAC has eight constituent units covering all sectors of the construction industry.

The infrastructure at Hyderabad consist of the following:

 24 lecture halls
 Three air-conditioned seminar halls
 500-seat air-conditioned auditorium
 Hostel for executives to accommodate 200 members
 Dormitory for workers with capacity to accommodate 500 trainees
 Post-graduate block
 Stores
 Full-fledged canteen 
 Workshop sheds and open space for conducting practical training

Apart from the above, NAC has quality control and testing laboratory for construction materials, material display block, practice ground, etc.

Faculty
NAC has a very experienced in-house faculty of 200 personnel and visiting faculty exposed to major projects.

Core competencies

NAC's core competency is training for the three categories of Human Resources in the construction industry.

 Primary level:	Mason, Bar-Bender, Form Work Carpenter, Plumber, Painter, Electrician, Welder, Operator Excavating Machinery, etc.
 Middle level: General Works Supervisor, Land Surveyor, Store Keeper, Architectural Assistant.
 Higher level: In-service engineers from government departments, major contracting firms, consultancy firms and practicing engineers.

The training programmes are conducted for candidates from all over India.

References

External links
 National Academy of Construction (NAC), Hyderabad  official site

Universities and colleges in Hyderabad, India
Construction organizations
Indian vocational education and training providers
Construction industry of India
1998 establishments in Andhra Pradesh
Educational institutions established in 1998